Middle Fork Cross Creek is a  long 2nd order tributary to North Fork Cross Creek in Washington County, Pennsylvania. This is the only stream of this name in the United States.

Course
Middle Fork Cross Creek rises at Cross Creek, Pennsylvania, in Washington County and then flows southwest to join Cross Creek at Pattersons Mill.

Watershed
Middle Fork Cross Creek drains  of area, receives about 40.3 in/year of precipitation, has a wetness index of 331.66, and is about 48% forested.

See also
List of Rivers of Pennsylvania

References

Rivers of Pennsylvania
Rivers of Washington County, Pennsylvania